Goh Meng Seng is a Singaporean politician who is a member of the opposition People's Power Party.

Political career
Goh contested in the 2006 general election with the Workers' Party in the Aljunied Group Representation Constituency (Aljunied GRC) as one of 5 team members. The team garnered 43.9% of the votes, finished as one of the top three non-ruling party district performers and was eligible for a Non-constituency Member of Parliament (NCMP) position which was taken up by team-leader Sylvia Lim.

Goh left the Workers' Party in 2006 after the election due to "some Internet postings which had tarnished the WP's reputation" despite being a member of the central executive committee (CEC) and a member of the "A team" of the Workers' Party. He joined the National Solidarity Party and became its secretary-general. Goh contested in the 2011 general election in the five-man Tampines Group Representation Constituency as team leader against the incumbent Mah Bow Tan (the Minister for National Development), receiving 42.78% of the votes.  Though his team lost, they improved significantly by 11.29% relative to the Singapore Democratic Alliance team that contested in the same district and finished with 31.49% of the votes against Mah in the 2006 general election.

Goh stepped down from his post as secretary-general of NSP after the 2011 election in June 2011 "for a breather and to take stock of his future", went into partisan political sabbatical to help presidential hopeful Tan Kin Lian in his bid for presidency. Goh was not elected into NSP's 14th central executive committee thereafter. Goh Meng Seng left NSP after the 2011 election.

He returned to live with his family in Hong Kong after the 2011 election, from which he continues his political contribution mostly in the form of Facebook postings. In a post, Goh courted controversy by suggesting that NSP was 'exacting revenge' on the Workers Party by contesting for the Hougang Single Member Constituency seat in the 2012 Hougang by-election.

In May 2015, Goh announced that he was setting-up a new political party called the People's Power Party (PPP) barely a few months before the 2015 election.  He became the party leader. The application was approved officially in July 2015. The death of Lee Kuan Yew was cited as one of the reasons for Goh's motivation to set up PPP, saying that without Lee's presence, "there's no one else who has such a strong political morality who can control everyone", and checks and balances can be achieved with separation of powers among different parties.

PPP contested in the 2015 Singaporean general election as the youngest party. It only contested the four-seat Chua Chu Kang Group Representation Constituency.  The team consists of himself, Lee Tze Shih, Low Wai Choo and Syafarin Sarif. The team lost to the People's Action Party team, which consisted of Gan Kim Yong, Low Yen Ling, Zaqy Mohamad and Yee Chia Hsing. The PPP garnered 25,460 or 23.11% of the valid votes. The PAP garnered 84,731 or 76.89% of the valid votes.

Goh contested in his final election in the 2020 Singaporean general election, facing against Tin Pei Ling in the contest for MacPherson Single Member Constituency, subsequently losing 28.26%-71.74% to Tin.
In December 2021, Goh was issued a POFMA for peddling fake news that HIV and COVID-19, two viruses from unrelated families could recombine and for discouraging people from taking the COVID-19 vaccine. On 14 October 2022, Goh was issued a POFMA again for peddling fake news that the SARS-CoV-2 XBB variant causes more severe illness and that the dead are piling up in mortuaries, funeral parlours, and crematoriums.

Education
Goh was educated at River Valley High School and Hwa Chong Junior College, before going on to the National University of Singapore where he completed a Bachelor of Arts and Bachelor of Social Science (Honours) in Economics.

References

National Solidarity Party (Singapore) politicians
Workers' Party (Singapore) politicians
National University of Singapore alumni
Hwa Chong Junior College alumni
Singaporean people of Chinese descent
1970 births
Living people